Gosan Station is a station of the Daegu Metro Line 2 in Siji-dong, Suseong District, Daegu, South Korea. While Siji-dong is a single legal dong, Gosan-dong is the administrative dong.

External links 
  Cyber station information from Daegu Metropolitan Transit Corporation

Daegu Metro stations
Suseong District
Railway stations opened in 2005